Old Bluff Presbyterian Church is a historic Presbyterian church located near Wade, Cumberland County, North Carolina.

The church congregation was founded in 1758.  Later its pastor was the Rev. John McLeod, who came from the Isle of Skye, Scotland, in 1770.  He was accompanied by many families of Highland Scots.  In 1858 the congregation dedicated a new church building constructed in the Greek Revival style.

The church is a plain, weatherboarded building with details that appear to be neoclassical moldings, including drill work suggesting triglyphs, dentils, and egg-and-dart, on the frieze and pediment. It is a large Greek Revival style temple form building. It features a two-story, five-bay tetrastyle porch in antis.

It was listed on the National Register of Historic Places in 1974.

References

External links

Old Bluff Presbyterian Church History

Presbyterian churches in North Carolina
Churches on the National Register of Historic Places in North Carolina
Greek Revival church buildings in North Carolina
Churches completed in 1858
19th-century Presbyterian church buildings in the United States
Churches in Cumberland County, North Carolina
Scottish-American culture in North Carolina
National Register of Historic Places in Cumberland County, North Carolina
Wooden churches in North Carolina